The president of the Republic of Yemen is the head of state of Yemen. Under the Constitution of Yemen, the president is also the Supreme Commander of the Armed Forces and head of the executive branch of the Yemeni government.

As of 7 April 2022, the powers of the president are exercised by the Presidential Leadership Council, headed by a chairman. The chairman of the Presidential Leadership Council is vested with sweeping powers, including the ability to unilaterally command the military and appoint governors and other key officials.

The first and longest-serving president of unified Yemen was Ali Abdullah Saleh and the second was Abdrabbuh Mansur Hadi, who took office on 27 February 2012. The legality of his claim to presidency is in question, as he was the only candidate in the 2012 election and the end of his mandate was originally set for 27 February 2014. His mandate was extended for another year. However, he remained in power after the expiration of his mandate, and on 22 January 2015, he handed over his resignation. He reaffirmed that he intended on resigning two weeks later. After his resignation, the government was assumed by the Houthi Supreme Revolutionary Committee. However, on 21 February 2015, Hadi presented himself as the president again, in Aden. On 7 April 2022, in a televised address, Hadi resigned, dismissed Vice President Ali Mohsen al-Ahmar, and transferred the powers of the president and vice president to the Presidential Leadership Council, with Rashad al-Alimi, former interior minister under President Saleh, as its chairman. The Hadi faction's claim to the presidency is contested by the Houthi Supreme Political Council's chairman, Mahdi al-Mashat, who is only recognized by Iran. Rashad Al-Alimi, met King Salman and Crown Prince Mohammed bin Salman, during an official visit to Saudi Arabia on 29 April 2022 for support of all peace efforts in Yemen and the region.

Latest election

See also
President of Yemen Arab Republic (North Yemen)
List of heads of state of Yemen
List of leaders of South Yemen

References

External links
World Statesmen - Yemen

Yemen
Presidents
Presidents
1990 establishments in Yemen